= Hillcrest, New Jersey =

Hillcrest, New Jersey can refer to:

- Hillcrest, Paterson
- Hillcrest, Trenton, New Jersey
